Phycothais reticulata is a species of sea snail, a marine gastropod mollusk in the family Muricidae, the murex snails or rock snails.

Description
The length of the shell attains 16.8 mm.

Distribution
This species occurs in the Red Sea; also around Australia and off Tasmania.

References

 Fishelson, L., 1971. Ecology and distribution of the benthic fauna in the shallow waters of the Red Sea. Mar. Biol., Berl. 10 2: 113–133
 Claremont M., Vermeij G.J., Williams S.T. & Reid D.G. (2013) Global phylogeny and new classification of the Rapaninae (Gastropoda: Muricidae), dominant molluscan predators on tropical rocky seashores. Molecular Phylogenetics and Evolution 66: 91–102.

External links
 Blainville, H. M. D. de. (1832). Disposition méthodique des espèces récentes et fossiles des genres Pourpre, Ricinule, Licorne et Concholépas de M. de Lamarck, et description des espèces nouvelles ou peu connues, faisant partie de la collection du Muséum d'Histoire Naturelle de Paris. Nouvelles Annales du Muséum d'Histoire Naturelle. 1: 189-263, pls 9-12
 Quoy J.R.C. & Gaimard J.P. (1832-1835). Voyage de découvertes de l'"Astrolabe" exécuté par ordre du Roi, pendant les années 1826-1829, sous le commandement de M. J. Dumont d'Urville. Zoologie. 
 Crosse, H. & Fischer, P. (1865). Description d'espèces nouvelles de l'Australie méridionale. Journal de Conchyliologie. 13: 38-55, pl. 3
 Tan K. S. (2003) Phylogenetic analysis and taxonomy of some southern Australian and New Zealand Muricidae (Mollusca: Neogastropoda). Journal of Natural History 37(8): 911-1028

Phycothais
Gastropods described in 1833